Amatsu-Mikaboshi, the Chaos King,  is a fictional character appearing in American comic books published by Marvel Comics. The character is usually depicted as a supervillain and demonic god of evil who is best known as an enemy of Hercules and Thor. He is based on the Mikaboshi of Japanese mythology.

Publication history
Amatsu-Mikaboshi first appeared in Thor: Blood Oath #6 (February 2006), and was adapted from mythology by Michael Oeming and Scott Kolins.

The character subsequently appears in Ares #1-5 (March–July 2006), and The Incredible Hercules #117-120 (May–August 2008).

Fictional character biography

History
According to the Official Handbook of the Marvel Universe'''s profile on Mikaboshi, billions of years ago, after the Demogorge had purged the degenerated Elder Gods, the Shinto gods Izanagi (a seventh-generational deity of the ancient Amatsu-Kami pantheon) and Izanami (an aspect of the Elder Goddess of Earth, Gaea) ventured into a formless world (Earth) that was dominated by a dark, primordial void where the ancient force of nature known as Amatsu-Mikaboshi existed and reigned alone. The divine couple began to populate the world with living creatures as well as lesser Amatsu-Kami who later came to be worshipped as gods by the inhabitants of Japan, which enraged Mikaboshi. His attempts to topple the fledgling Amatsu-Kami pantheon were foiled, and Mikaboshi was forced to descend to Yomi, which Izanagi designated as the netherworld of the Japanese, where he remained for centuries.Thor & Hercules: Encyclopaedia Mythologica Vol 1 #1

Secret Invasion
Amatsu-Mikaboshi joins Hercules' "God Squad", over Hercules' violent objections. He is the delegate offered by the Gods of the East, led by Izanagi-no-Mikoto, who say it is an opportunity for him to redeem himself (though Hercules later suggests that they probably just wanted him off their hands and when he first sees Mikaboshi he attacks him). Mikaboshi is useful in stealing a map from Nightmare's realm allowing the God Squad to get to the Skrull Dreamtime and the Skrull Gods. He is seemingly killed by the Skrull goddess Sl'gur't in the final battle, but is then revealed to have survived and killed the Skrull goddess when she was in his form, now in command of the dead Skrull gods' army of slave deities.  Mikaboshi vows revenge on the Olympians, free of the Kami's seals and unaware he is being observed through an enchanted scrying pool by a smiling Athena, Goddess of Wisdom, who claimed her plans had gone even better than had been expected.

The Primordial Darkness
Some time later, it is revealed that Athena has been preparing for many years against the great struggle with a "primordial darkness" soon to descend upon the world, that being Mikaboshi, and telling Amadeus Cho that the strength of Hercules would be useless against King Chaos, but Cho's super-genius hypermind may yet bring them triumph.  Hera later has a vision of Mikaboshi slaying Sharra and K'ythri, the gods of the Shi'ar race, and identifies Mikaboshi as the personification of the darkness that existed before the creation of the world.

Chaos War
The gods of Zenn-La, upon detecting Mikaboshi's approach, convene to prepare to combat his spreading darkness. Thrann, Saint of Science, tells them that the First Mover, who gave the Marvel Universe "orbit, organization, and order" from a void of chaos and nothingness, extrapolated the coming of the Nil Star as the herald of the End Times eons ago. Mikaboshi, with an army of enslaved alien deities, invades the Cosmic Plane of Zenn-La's gods and easily destroys them despite their united efforts, enslaving them to further bolster his forces. Mikaboshi next begins his assault on Earth, brutally slaying the Impossible Man despite the latter's attempts to humor him and his complex shapeshifting. Mikaboshi next destroys Nightmare and claims the Dream Lord's powers, thus disabling most of Earth's mortal defenders and trapping them in sleep. Hercules attempts to summon Eternity to fight for the remaining protectors of Earth, but Eternity tells them that such would be akin to fighting himself, as Mikaboshi is the void against which he is defined. The rulers of Hell rally against Mikaboshi, joining their strengths to defend Perdition from his clutches, but even they eventually fall to his immense power, with Mikaboshi overpowering and devouring Satan and his power, obliterating the Underworld and causing the cosmic entity Death herself to flee the Marvel Universe. Mikaboshi takes control of an army of dead beings, including Zeus.

After enslaving the fallen gods of Olympus and using them to attack the newly formed God Squad, even managing to down mighty Galactus himself through Zeus, Mikaboshi and his army erupts from the former Olympian Skyfather's chest after tricking Hercules into piercing the shields concealing the hitherto hidden Throne Room of the Council Elite's Celestial Axis, launching a devastating assault on the divine realms of all of Earth's pantheons and destroying most of the gods, even the various Godheads themselves. Though the Amatsu-Kami themselves muster their strength and confront Mikaboshi, with their chief sun goddess Amaterasu vowing to defeat Mikaboshi as they did long ages past, Mikaboshi slays her, defeats the remaining members of her pantheon, and enslaves them all against the God Squad, who initially intend to seal Mikaboshi back into Yomi before the Kami betray and attack them.

Amatsu-Mikaboshi even gained allies in Nekra and a resurrected Grim Reaper. He even recruited Abomination and empowered him to serve him. During Doctor Strange's fight with Abomination, Amatsu-Mikaboshi attacked Doctor Strange from behind and reawakened the Zom part of Doctor Strange to assist Amatsu-Mikaboshi in looking for Marlo Chandler. Amatsu-Mikaboshi even unleashed Carrion Crow: Eater of the Dead to antagonize the revived X-Men members for the fate of one of Destiny's diaries that might hold the key to defeating Amatsu-Mikaboshi.

Amatsu-Mikaboshi relished the slow death of his oldest enemy, the Elder Goddess Gaea, who herself is the fountainhead of creation and the one who birthed the Gods themselves. Amatsu-Mikaboshi sends Athena to attack her brother and the God Squad on an island, who joined him so the Universe could be recreated. Yet Athena ends up defeated by Hercules. Hercules takes his fight to Amatsu-Mikaboshi and the heroes attack him. The Chaos King begins to consume all reality into nothingness, though in reality he has been sealed into the continuity that Cho and Galactus planned to evacuate Earth into.

Powers and abilities

Mikaboshi possessed the conventional abilities of one of the Kami, the order of Japanese deities, such as superhuman strength, speed, durability, agility, endurance and recuperative abilities, as well as high ability to wield some form of potent Japanese dark magic, a brand of sorcery that seems especially effective against the Olympian deities. His physical strength, at least in his main incarnation, is considerably less than that of Zeus or Izanagi, and is roughly equal to that of the average Kami, but Mikaboshi can project energy on a scale at least rivaling that of Zeus and Izanagi. Like the Asgardians, the Japanese gods are extremely long-lived but not truly immortal like the Olympians; they tend to age at an extremely slow rate upon reaching adulthood and are three times denser than normal human beings, although Mikaboshi himself is immortal.

Mikaboshi possesses vast supernatural power, which is apparently inherent within him. He can use this mystical energy for a variety of effects, among which are his ability to alter his form and shape; he also often taken on a female form to appear harmless. He is otherwise almost always represented as a being of black, shadowy energy with a mask for a face. He can reshape his limbs into razor-sharp blades, form tentacles and tendrils to attack enemies, and assume the form of a fire-breathing serpent, which Apollo's fire was unable to affect and which was able to retaliate with a blast of fire powerful enough to harm and strike down even the Olympian sun deity. He has employed powers of flight, teleportation, the projection of mystical energy as force blasts, invisibility, matter manipulation, image projection and the creation of inter-dimensional nexus points among other feats, such as creating "shadow copies" capable of avoiding detection by high-level dark magical entities such as Nightmare in the latter's own realm. His power is of such extent that he can control numerous minor demons, as well as animating and manipulating corpses en masse at will; moreover, even the Kami themselves appear wary and fearful of Mikaboshi whom they consider their primal foe, especially as he himself has slaughtered much of their pantheon. Mikaboshi was able to slay even formidable alien deities having destroyed the Demogorge (an entity who devoured the Elder Gods themselves) with relatively little effort, as well as crippling and slaying Skyfathers such as Zeus by tearing out his heart in seconds.

More akin to a force of nature than a physical being, and having existed as a dark, primordial void that once dominated Earth (and before even that, the Marvel Universe, and before even this, the realities predating the Marvel Universe itself) in its earliest days, Mikaboshi's true form is elusive. He apparently exists as a single golden eye characterized by a slit-like iris. The eye is surrounded by an amorphous mass of dark energy, which Mikaboshi can form into tangible objects of virtually any form he can imagine, such as whip-like tentacles or a humanoid body. He can also assume a comet-like appearance (with his eye serving as the comet's nucleus) and propel himself at incredible speeds. He is immune to most diseases and possesses extremely quick reflexes. Mikaboshi possesses an extremely high intellect rivaling that of genius-level, and is an accomplished strategist, though his preferred tactic is simply overwhelming opponents with the sheer number of his demonic foot-soldiers. His army contains many netherworld denizens, mostly shinma and oni.

As a demonic entity, and the conqueror of Yomi, Japanese underworld of the Kami, Mikaboshi also has several powers enabling him to capture and detain the astral bodies (sheaths of the soul) of recently deceased human beings; on at least one instance, Mikaboshi has been shown capable of releasing a deceased mortal soul back into the realm of the living.

After seizing control over thousands of alien deities of the Skrulls, and using them to tear through worlds and realities to eliminate the gods of countless other extraterrestrial civilizations, such as the gods of the Shi'ar and the gods of Zenn-La, Mikaboshi was able to gather enough power to shed his "Terran form" and emerge as the Chaos King, the primal embodiment of nothingness and primordial chaos that served as a natural opposing power to both Eternity and Death, and a threat to the entire Marvel Multiverse, and all its powered mortals, living or dead, abstract conceptual beings, cosmic entities and lesser divinities.

Oblivion said that Amatsu-Mikaboshi was merely one aspect of himself.

Reception
 In 2020, CBR.com'' ranked Amatsu-Mikaboshi 4th in their "10 Marvel Gods With The Highest Kill Count" list.

References

External links

Comics characters introduced in 2006
Fictional characters who can manipulate darkness or shadows
Fictional characters who can turn invisible 
Fictional characters with absorption or parasitic abilities 
Fictional characters who can duplicate themselves
Fictional characters with spirit possession or body swapping abilities
Fictional characters with superhuman durability or invulnerability
Fictional characters with dimensional travel abilities 
Fictional characters with elemental transmutation abilities 
Fictional characters with death or rebirth abilities 
Fictional soul collectors
Marvel Comics characters who are shapeshifters
Marvel Comics characters who can move at superhuman speeds
Marvel Comics characters who can teleport
Marvel Comics characters who have mental powers
Marvel Comics characters who use magic
Marvel Comics characters with accelerated healing
Marvel Comics characters with superhuman strength
Marvel Comics deities
Marvel Comics demons
Marvel Comics male supervillains
Marvel Comics telepaths
Japanese mythology in popular culture